Allyl alcohol (IUPAC name: prop-2-en-1-ol) is an organic compound with the structural formula .  Like many alcohols, it is a water-soluble, colourless liquid.  It is more toxic than typical small alcohols. Allyl alcohol is used as a raw material for the production of glycerol, but is also used as a precursor to many specialized compounds such as flame-resistant materials, drying oils, and plasticizers.  Allyl alcohol is the smallest representative of the allylic alcohols.

Production
Allyl alcohol can be obtained by many methods. It was first prepared in 1856 by Auguste Cahours and August Hofmann by hydrolysis of allyl iodide. Today allyl alcohol is produced commercially by the Olin and Shell corporations through the hydrolysis of allyl chloride:
CH2=CHCH2Cl + NaOH -> CH2=CHCH2OH + NaCl
Allyl alcohol can also be made by the rearrangement of propylene oxide, a reaction that is catalyzed by potassium alum at high temperature. The advantage of this method relative to the allyl chloride route is that it does not generate salt. Also avoiding chloride-containing intermediates is the "acetoxylation" of propylene to allyl acetate:
CH2=CHCH3 + 1/2 O2 + CH3COOH -> CH2=CHCH2OCOCH3 + H2O
Hydrolysis of this acetate gives allyl alcohol. In alternative fashion, propylene can be oxidized to acrolein, which upon hydrogenation gives the alcohol.

Other methods
In principle, allyl alcohol can be obtained by dehydrogenation of propanol. In the laboratory, it has been prepared by the reaction of glycerol with oxalic or formic acids. Allyl alcohols in general can be prepared by allylic oxidation of allyl compounds by selenium dioxide.

Applications
Allyl alcohol is converted mainly to glycidol, which is a chemical intermediate in the synthesis of glycerol, glycidyl ethers, esters, and amines. Also, a variety of polymerizable esters are prepared from allyl alcohol, e.g. diallyl phthalate.

Safety
Allyl alcohol is more toxic than related alcohols.  Its threshold limit value (TLV) is 2 ppm.  It is a lachrymator.

It is classified as an extremely hazardous substance in the United States as defined in Section 302 of the U.S. Emergency Planning and Community Right-to-Know Act (42 U.S.C. 11002), and is subject to strict reporting requirements by facilities which produce, store, or use it in significant quantities.

See also
 Dioxalin
 Propargyl alcohol

References

External links 

 State of Michigan public information on allyl alcohol
 Occupational exposure guidelines

Primary alcohols
Allyl compounds
Hepatotoxins